Cockburn Harbour is a settlement in the Turks and Caicos. It is the largest community on the island of South Caicos, with some 811 people. It has the best natural harbour of the Caicos Islands, and was once an important centre for regional trade and a major exporter of salt. Today its main industries are fishing and tourism.

See also

List of lighthouses in the Turks and Caicos Islands

References
 
 

Populated places in the Turks and Caicos Islands
Lighthouses in the Turks and Caicos Islands